Talida-Teodora Gîdoiu (born 12 January 1986  in Orșova) is a Romanian rowing cox. She finished 4th in the eight at the 2012 Summer Olympics.

References

External links
 
 
 
 

1986 births
Living people
People from Orșova
Romanian female rowers
Rowers at the 2012 Summer Olympics
Olympic rowers of Romania
World Rowing Championships medalists for Romania
European Rowing Championships medalists